Auragne is a commune in the Haute-Garonne department in southwestern France.

Population

The inhabitants are known as Auragnais.

See also
Communes of the Haute-Garonne department

References

External links

  A web site about Auragne

Communes of Haute-Garonne